Dmitry Ignatenko (born 24 October 1988) is a Belarusian professional footballer who plays for Naftan Novopolotsk.

Honours
Shakhtyor Soligorsk
Belarusian Cup winner: 2018–19

External links
 
 
 Profile at teams.by

1988 births
Living people
People from Mogilev
Sportspeople from Mogilev Region
Belarusian footballers
Association football midfielders
Belarusian Premier League players
Belarusian First League players
FC Dnepr Mogilev players
FC Gorki players
FC Spartak Shklov players
FC Smorgon players
FC Granit Mikashevichi players
FC Torpedo-BelAZ Zhodino players
FC Gorodeya players
FC Shakhtyor Soligorsk players
FC Dnyapro Mogilev players
FC Sputnik Rechitsa players
FC Naftan Novopolotsk players